Chuu Wai Nyein (born 1992 in Yatsaut, Shan State) is a painter, performance artist and activist from Myanmar who has lived in exile in Paris following the 2021 Myanmar coup d'état.

Early life and education
Chuu first graduated with a bachelor's degree in IT Engineering Technological University, Mandalay,  She then earned a Postgraduate Diploma in Art, National University of Art and Culture, Mandalay. She studied under U Chit Thaw (Myingyan), U Khin Maung San (Mandalay), U Suu Myint Thein (Alin-Dagar Art School), U Nay San (Amar-Pura), U Win Pe Myint, Justice Art, Nation University of Art, Culture (Mandalay) and other.

References

Living people
1992 births
Burmese painters
Burmese performance artists